Montana Municipality is a municipality in Montana Province, Bulgaria. It includes the city of Montana and a number of villages.

Demography

Religion 
According to the latest Bulgarian census of 2011, the religious composition, among those who answered the optional question on religious identification, was the following:

References 

Municipalities in Montana Province